Dawson Township is an inactive township in Phelps County, in the U.S. state of Missouri.

Dawson Township has the name of William Dawson, a pioneer judge.

References

Townships in Missouri
Townships in Phelps County, Missouri